All Seasons Place is a shopping mall at Air Itam, a suburb of George Town in Penang, Malaysia. Opened in 2012, it is the first strip mall in Penang and forms part of All Seasons Park, a mixed residential-commercial development.

The three-storey, open-air mall was designed by Cottee Parker Architects, a renowned Australian architectural firm. Most of the mall's retail outlets are arranged in a  row facing the Thean Teik Highway with sidewalks stretching along the outlets and with ample of indoor and outdoor car park.

Retail outlets 
Main anchor tenant is the established Hero Market and several other tenants of various categories such as Optical, Education, Fitness, Beauty, Wellness, Food and Beverages. The Hero Market store commenced operations in 2018 at All Seasons Place.

In addition, a flea market opens within the mall every weekend, offering apparel at discounted prices.

Rapid Penang bus 13, which serves Paya Terubong, Air Itam, Batu Lanchang and Gelugor, passes in front of the mall.

See also 
 List of shopping malls in Malaysia

References

External links 
 All Seasons Place

Shopping malls in Penang
Shopping malls established in 2012
Buildings and structures in George Town, Penang
2012 establishments in Malaysia